Sirud and Sehrud may refer to:
 Sirud, Alborz
 Sirud, Mazandaran